The Sarangani–Sultan Kudarat Coastal Road or Awang–Upi–Lebak–Kalamansig–Palimbang–Sarangani Road is a 323-kilometre (201 mi), two-to-four lane national secondary road, connecting the provinces of Maguindanao, Sultan Kudarat, Sarangani, and South Cotabato. It starts from Datu Odin Sinsuat in Maguindanao and ends at General Santos in South Cotabato.

The entire road is designated as National Route 935 (N935) of the Philippine highway network.

Intersections

References 

Roads in Maguindanao del Norte
Roads in Maguindanao del Sur
Roads in Sultan Kudarat
Roads in Sarangani
Roads in South Cotabato